The scrub tanager (Stilpnia vitriolina) is a species of bird in the family Thraupidae.

It is found in Colombia and Ecuador. Its natural habitats are subtropical or tropical moist montane forests, subtropical or tropical high-altitude shrubland, and heavily degraded former forest.

References

scrub tanager
Birds of the Colombian Andes
Birds of the Ecuadorian Andes
scrub tanager
Taxonomy articles created by Polbot
Taxobox binomials not recognized by IUCN